Bue is a surname. Notable people with the surname include:

Bjørn Bue (1934–1997), Norwegian Lutheran missionary and bishop
Papa Bue (1930–2011), Danish trombonist and bandleader 
Tiril Bue (born 1993), Norwegian competitive sailor

See also
Lo Bue